The Bennie Railplane was a form of rail transport invented by George Bennie (1891–1957), which moved along an overhead rail by way of propellers.

Prototype
Bennie, born at Auldhouse, near Glasgow, Scotland began work on the development of his railplane in 1921. In 1929-1930 he built a prototype on a trial stretch of track over a  line at Milngavie, off the Glasgow and Milngavie Junction Railway, with one railplane car to demonstrate the system to potential clients. The car ran along an overhead monorail, stabilised by guide rails below. It moved by propellers powered by on-board motors. It was intended to run above conventional railways, separating faster passenger traffic from slower freight traffic. Slow and heavy goods freight and local passenger services would continue on the traditional rail service below. Each car could carry a maximum of 48 people; the prototype had seating for fewer.

In spite of interest from around the world, Bennie could not obtain the financial backing he required to develop his revolutionary transport system. The proposed line from Edinburgh to Glasgow was not built, nor was the one between Southport and Blackpool. By 1937, Bennie was bankrupt. He had financed most of the work himself.

The prototype railplane lay rusting in a field at Milngavie until it was sold for scrap in 1956. Bennie died the following year. The original shed where the carriage was built in Main Street, Milngavie is now occupied by a timber merchant, and has a blue commemorative plaque on the outside wall.

See also
Wuppertal Suspension Railway
Aérotrain
Suspension railway

Further reading
 
 Black, William B. The Bennie Railplane. East Dunbartonshire Council.

References

External links
 George Bennie Railtrack, Baldernock Parish
 The Bennie Railplane, Gear Wheels Online Motoring Magazine
 George Bennie Railplane System of Transport (1930) (archive film from the National Library of Scotland: Scottish Screen Archive)
 Railplane newsreel footage at British Pathe
 Film of test run (BBC Scotland)
 The Newcomen Rolt Prize
 Further info on Mike's Railway History
 
 Footage

Experimental locomotives
Experimental and prototype high-speed trains
Milngavie
Rail transport in Scotland
Railway services introduced in 1930